This article shows all participating team squads at the 2008 Final Four Women's Volleyball Cup, held from September 3 to September 7, 2008 in Fortaleza, Brazil.

Head Coach: Horacio Bastit

Head Coach: José Roberto Guimarães

Head Coach: Luiz Bonilla

Head Coach: Marcos Kwiek

References 
 NORCECA

F
F